Stagecoach Yorkshire is an operating division of Stagecoach Group. 

It was formed in 2005 to take over the former Traction Group fleets in Yorkshire by Stagecoach Group, which took over Traction from Frank Carter on 14 December 2005; Yorkshire Traction, Yorkshire Terrier and Barnsley & District.  Since then the geographical coverage of the division has changed, with the divestment of services in the Huddersfield area  and the addition of Derbyshire operations from Stagecoach East Midlands.

Stagecoach Sheffield services are marketed alongside the Sheffield Supertram, operated by Stagecoach since 1997. Stagecoach Sheffield also operated the related SupertramLink bus until it was withdrawn in October 2022.

History

The Yorkshire Traction Group was a large independent bus operator that had grown out of bus deregulation and the break-up of the National Bus Company in the UK. The company was formed in 1987 when the Barnsley-based Yorkshire Traction subsidiary was sold to its management and employees, led by Frank Carter. Yorkshire Terrier was an independent post-deregulation bus company operating in Sheffield that had been formed in 1988 following the closure of a South Yorkshire Transport depot, and had also expanded itself with acquisition of some smaller operators within Sheffield; in 2000 Yorkshire Traction purchased Yorkshire Terrier along with the operations of Andrews, South Riding, Sheffield Omnibus, and Kingsman, all in Sheffield, which all competed with Mainline in the city. Mainline would be sold to FirstBus in 1998 and was soon rebranded First South Yorkshire.

Barnsley & District was formed in July 1990 when Traction bought Tom Jowitt Travel of Tankersley. It was enlarged in 1992 when Pride of The Road, Royston was purchased, and in 1995, when the bus operations of Globe of Barnsley were taken over.

In December 2005, the Stagecoach Group acquired the Traction Group, and with it, the operations of Yorkshire Traction, which would subsequently become Stagecoach Yorkshire. Following the takeover by Stagecoach, Barnsley & District was closed and absorbed into Yorkshire Traction in July 2006, and three months later the Stagecoach in Chesterfield operation was transferred into Stagecoach Yorkshire from Stagecoach East Midlands. The Chesterfield operation had been founded in 1987 as East Midland Motor Services and, at the time of the takeover by Stagecoach Yorkshire, employed 320 people and carried around eight million passengers every year, an increase of 10% over the previous year.

In May 2008, following rumours that Arriva would purchase Stagecoach's Huddersfield operations, it was announced that Centrebus Holdings, a joint venture between Centrebus and Arriva, who held a 40% stake in Centrebus, would buy the division. Arriva would sell their stake in Centrebus and rebrand its wholly owned Huddersfield operations to Yorkshire Tiger in September 2013. In July 2021, Yorkshire Tiger was taken over by Transdev Blazefield and rebranded Team Pennine.

Stagecoach Yorkshire's first Stagecoach Gold service commenced on Monday 10 November 2014. The X17 service running between Sheffield, Chesterfield and Matlock, recently extended from Sheffield to Meadowhall and Barnsley, was upgraded with a fleet of Scania N230UD Alexander Dennis Enviro400s with high-specification interiors.

SupertramLink

Stagecoach in Sheffield operate a SupertramLink bus that extends the Stagecoach Supertram yellow route during the day. SupertramLink 1 (SL1/SL1A) runs from the Middlewood park and ride site at the northern Yellow route terminus, to Stocksbridge approximately 5 miles away, via Oughtibridge and the A6102. The service links with the yellow tram terminus at Middlewood, and buses run at the same frequencies as the tram during the daytime, however the service is reduced to an hourly rate in the evening, despite the tram running every 20 minutes. The SL1 service was withdrawn on 1 June 2020, with local bus service 57 being enhanced to provide better links with the tram from Hillsborough instead of Middlewood.   The services have since been reinstated. 

Additionally, two former SupertramLink bus services have previously operated; Supertram Link 2 (SL2) ran from the Malin Bridge tramstop to Stannington, whilst the SupertramLink3 (SL3) operated between Crystal Peaks and Killamarsh in south Sheffield. Both of these routes have since been discontinued.

Depots
Stagecoach Yorkshire operate services from five bus depots across South Yorkshire and North East Derbyshire, listed below.

Barnsley (Wakefield Road)
Chesterfield (Stonegravels)
Ecclesfield (Green Lane)
Holbrook (Rother Valley Way)
Rawmarsh (Dale Road)

The former depot in Holmfirth was transferred to Centrebus Holdings as part of the sale of the division's West Yorkshire network of services in May 2008.

Fleet

As of April 2020, Stagecoach Yorkshire's fleet consisted of 384 buses.

Stagecoach Yorkshire was among a handful of Stagecoach operators to receive Alexander Dennis Enviro400 Hybrids, which were deployed to its services in the Sheffield area. The first 21 Enviro400 Hybrids were delivered in 2011 and a further 19 were delivered in 2012. Also unique to Stagecoach Yorkshire are eighteen Wright StreetLite HEVs purchased with funding from South Yorkshire PTE for services in Sheffield in 2018.

Prior to their takeover in 2005, the Traction Group was known for a lot of variety among its bus fleet; Yorkshire Traction's fleet included the unique KIRN Mogul with East Lancashire Flyte body, a large fleet of Scania buses dating back to the 1990s, which were relatively rare then, and Traction were the only major buyer of MAN 14.220s, all with East Lancs Myllennium bodies. Many more rare vehicles have operated in the fleet, as well as more familiar vehicles, such as Dennis Darts, with Plaxton and Alexander bodies, low-floor Dart SLFs and Volvo B6BLEs with East Lancashire Spryte bodies, plus some ex-Blazefield Volvo B10Bs and B10BLEs with Wright bodies and Alexander ALX200-bodied Volvo B6LEs. Terrier's fleet was more standardised, with East Lancashire Spryte-bodied Dennis Darts and Volvo B6BLEs, East Lancashire Myllennium-bodied DAF SB220s, a single low-floor Volvo B6 with Plaxton Pointer bodywork, and 10 Alexander Dennis Pointer Darts.

Gallery

See also
 List of bus operators of the United Kingdom

References

External links

 
 Travel South Yorkshire – public transport information for South Yorkshire
 Derbyshire County Council – public transport information for Derbyshire
 South Yorkshire Passenger Transport Executive
 Yorkshire Traction – legacy website
 SupertramLink bus official site

Stagecoach Group bus operators in England
Bus operators in South Yorkshire
Bus operators in Derbyshire
Companies based in Barnsley
Chesterfield, Derbyshire